Ahmed Hikmet (born 5 October 1984) is a retired Bulgarian footballer who played as a midfielder.

References

External links
 
 
 Profile at LevskiAcademy.com
 FuPa.net

1984 births
Living people
People from Shumen
Bulgarian footballers
First Professional Football League (Bulgaria) players
Second Professional Football League (Bulgaria) players
PFC Spartak Varna players
PFC Beroe Stara Zagora players
FC Montana players
PFC Vidima-Rakovski Sevlievo players
FC Etar 1924 Veliko Tarnovo players
PFC Minyor Pernik players
PFC Chernomorets Burgas players
FC Chernomorets Balchik players
FC Hebar Pazardzhik players
Bulgarian people of Turkish descent
Association football midfielders